James Fairfield English Jr. (February 15, 1927  June 2, 2020) was an American bank executive and college president.

Early years 

Born in Putnam, Connecticut, English attended and graduated from the Loomis Chaffee School. In 1944, he enlisted in the Army and was assigned to a Japanese language program. Upon completion, he served in the 441st Counter Intelligence Detachment, part of the Counterintelligence Corps, in the occupation of Japan.

Career 

In 1951, English took a job at the Connecticut Bank and Trust Company, where he ultimately became president, then chairman, and CEO.

From 1981 to 1989, he served as President of Trinity College in Hartford, Connecticut.

See also 

 List of Trinity College (Connecticut) people

References 

1927 births
2020 deaths
American bank presidents
Heads of universities and colleges in the United States
Military personnel from Connecticut
People from Putnam, Connecticut
Presidents of Trinity College (Connecticut)
United States Army personnel of World War II
Loomis Chaffee School alumni